Nene Park Academy (formerly Orton Longueville School) is a secondary academy school in Peterborough. The school was renamed in September 2011 when it converted to an academy upon joining Cambridge Meridian Academies Trust (CMAT). A new £15 million academy building was opened by Professor Robert Winston in February 2014. The academy's sponsorship by CMAT means it is partnered with the highly rated Swavesey Village College. Nene Park Academy is also home to Peterborough United Football Club's Youth Training Academy, and a partnership has been developed with the club.

Admissions
The academy provides for pupils aged 11–19 and the academy's population was just over 960 in the 2013–14 year. The academy has an admission limit of 180 for Year 7 students starting the 2014/15 academic year.

History

Grammar school

The academy began as Orton Longueville Grammar School in 1959. This was originally Fletton Grammar School in Old Fletton (also in Huntingdonshire), which opened in 1910, and moved to the new site. It kept Fletton's motto of Onward and Upward. The former Fletton school became a primary school on London Road. The 1959 Orton school was built by Huntingdonshire County Council (not the Soke of Peterborough which then contained most of Peterborough) on the grounds of Orton Hall, owned by the Marquess of Huntly. The hall is now a Best Western hotel. The grammar school had a catchment area as far south as the Alconburys and Sawtry. It was one of three grammar schools in the former Huntingdonshire (broadly coextensive with the current district of that name).

Comprehensive
Next door to the grammar school, the Orton Longueville Secondary Modern School opened in 1961, which merged with the grammar school in September 1970. This school was originally situated in Woodston. It was administered by Huntingdon and Peterborough from 1965, Cambridgeshire County Council from April 1974, and the City of Peterborough from 1998.

In 2003 the school was selected by the DfES as a designated Specialist Business and Enterprise College.  Two new computer suites were constructed to coincide with designation of specialist school.

Academy
On 31 August 2011 Orton Longueville School closed and reopened on 1 September 2011 as Nene Park Academy. The academy's new £15m building officially opened in February 2014, and has science laboratories, IT and digital media studios, and parkland in front of the academy, including a grass amphitheatre.

Academic performance 
Nene Park Academy was inspected by Ofsted in November 2013 and rated as "good" in all areas. The report stated, "Achievement is good and rapidly rising. Significant numbers of students from different ethnic backgrounds make outstanding progress", and, "Working together effectively, senior staff, governors, the Cambridge Meridian Academies' Trust and the local election authority have developed a good school in wonderful, new buildings."

In 2013, 97 per cent of pupils passed five or more A* to C grades at GCSE, with 60 per cent achieving five or more A*-C grades including English and maths. This was up by 11 per cent on the 2012 results.

In 2013, the academy recorded a pass rate above 97 per cent in A level results, with 12 per cent of pupils picking up A or A* grades.

2013 league tables also show that the academy's pupils' value added progress in year 11 is the highest in Peterborough and second highest in the whole of Cambridgeshire.

These results reflect dramatic improvement at the academy, as Orton Longueville School had been given a 'Notice to Improve' in 2006 after Ofsted rated the school's effectiveness as 'unsatisfactory'.

Alumni

Orton Longueville Grammar School
 Brian Brinkley, Commonwealth, World and Olympic medallist
 Dr Judy MacArthur Clark CBE, vet and Chief Inspector of the Animals (Scientific Procedures) Inspectorate since 2007, President of the Royal College of Veterinary Surgeons (RCVS) from 1992 to 1993, and Chair of the Farm Animal Welfare Council from 1999 to 2004.
 Nick Dempsey, Double Olympic medallist

Fletton Grammar School
 George Alcock MBE, astronomer
 Geoffrey Dear, Baron Dear, Chief Constable from 1985 to 1990 of West Midlands Police

Nene Park Academy
 Jaanai Gordon, footballer for Oxford City
 Ricky-Jade Jones, footballer for Peterborough United

References

External links
 EduBase
News items
 Tuberculosis in January 2006

Academies in Peterborough
Educational institutions established in 1959
Secondary schools in Peterborough
1959 establishments in England